This is a list of rail accidents from 2000 to 2009.

2000 
 January 4 – Norway – Åsta accident, Åsta in Åmot: Two diesel passenger trains collided in Rørosbanen killing 19. The fire after the collision lasted nearly six hours.
 February 6 – Germany – Brühl train derailment: The D 203 "Schweiz-Express" train travelling from Amsterdam to Basel negotiates a low speed turnout at three times the correct speed and derails near Brühl station, killing 9 people.
 March 2 – Denmark – Kølkær. Two regional trains heading to Herning and Vejle collided in Kolkær station. The train to Herning had entered the station and was slowing down, when it was hit head-on by the oncoming Vejle train at 116 km/h. 1 passenger in the Herning train and both train drivers were killed, 10 passengers were seriously injured. The investigation concluded that the crash was caused by the driver of the Vejle train, who had completely ignored stop signals.
 March 8 – Japan – Naka-Meguro derailment: The last car of a TRTA Hibiya Line train derails and is hit by a Tobu Railway train traveling in the opposite direction; five people died and 63 were injured.
 March 28 – United States – A school bus failed to stop at a crossbuck in Tennga, Georgia and drove into the path of an oncoming CSX train and was struck. Multiple injuries and fatalities. Crew suffered emotional trauma/shock due to incident.
 June 6 – Switzerland – A passenger train and a freight train collide at Hüswil. One person was killed.
 July 6 - France - In Paris, a Eurostar Train derailed due to a fault on the train track, 6 people were injured.
 July 13 – Canada –  A Canadian National train heading westbound pulling grain hoppers hit a semi-trailer that had become stuck at a level crossing west of Wainwright, Alberta. The two locomotives and 28 cars derailed. The train crew suffered only minor injuries after jumping from the train prior to the collision.
 August 26 – United States – A Dakota, Minnesota, and Eastern train bound for Central South Dakota was derailed in Brookings, South Dakota, killing the conductor and severely injuring the engineer.  The accident was caused intentionally by a vandal who broke the lock off of a railroad switch using a hammer and covering the warning reflector with at least one trash bag.  The suspect called it a 'prank.'
Four people are killed and 102 injured. This rail failure forces the biggest and most expensive re-railing exercise in British history, with huge service disruption for many months. Infrastructure owner Railtrack is found guilty in one of the longest rail-related trials in UK legal history, but manslaughter charges against company managers are not sustained.

 November 11 – Austria – Kaprun disaster: The Gletscherbahn 2 funicular train catches fire in a tunnel when an unsafely installed heater overheats. 155 people are killed and 12 survive.
 December 2 – India – Sarai Banjara rail disaster, a crowded commuter train crashes into a derailed freight train in Punjab. More than 45 people die.

2001 
 January 12 – Republic of the Congo – Nvoungouti: More than 30 people die when two trains collide because of a brake failure.
 February 7 – Canada – Toronto: Ontario Northland Railway's Northlander passenger train derails in the Don Valley near the Bayview Extension and Pottery Road area. 2 of the 23 passengers are injured slightly.
 February 28 – United Kingdom – Selby rail crash: A sleep-deprived driver on the M62 motorway falls asleep at the wheel, causing his Land Rover to swerve off the road. It travels down an embankment onto the main line below. After failing to reverse off the track, he exits the vehicle, and while he contacts emergency services, it is hit by a GNER InterCity 225 passenger train, which derails and collides at high speed with a coal train traveling in the opposite direction. 10 people are killed (all due to the second collision) and over 80 are injured. The Land Rover driver is later jailed for 5 years for causing death by dangerous driving.
 March 27 – Belgium – Pécrot rail crash: Two passenger trains collide on the same track. 8 people die and 12 are injured.  Lack of common language a factor.
 April 12 – Canada – Stewiacke Via derailment: a teenager tampers with a track switch, derailing Via Rail Canada's Ocean. As many as 22 people are injured in the resulting crash.
 May 15 – United States – CSX 8888 incident, Toledo, Ohio: A CSX freight train of 47 cars, including some with hazardous molten phenol acid, runs away in the yard at Toledo with no engineer aboard. The engineer had stepped out to reset a switch but had improperly applied the dynamic brake, causing the train to accelerate. Multiple locals attempt to jump on and stop it, but chicken out as they see the speed of the train. This incident was dubbed the "Crazy Eights" incident in reference to the lead locomotive's number (#8888). The incident inspired the Tony Scott film Unstoppable, starring Denzel Washington and Chris Pine.
 June 21 – India – Kadalundi train derailment: Six carriages of the Mangalore-Chennai Mail train derail while crossing Bridge 924 after it shifted following heavy rain. Three carriages plunge into the swollen Kadalundi River, killing 59 people.
 July 18 – United States – Howard Street Tunnel fire, Baltimore, Maryland: A 60-car CSX train carrying chemicals and wood products derails in a  tunnel, causing water contamination and a fire that burns for six days.
 July 29 – United States – An Amtrak Texas Eagle carrying 174 passengers and 12 engineers (in 2 locomotives with unknown unit numbers, and 19 Amtrak cars including baggage cars) from San Antonio to Chicago derailed in Sabula, Missouri, located 120 miles away from St. Louis, possibly due to severe weather and flash flooding. Prior to the derailment, the National Weather Service issued a Flash Flood Warning for Iron County, where the derailment occurred. 4 passengers and the engineer were reported injured and taken to the hospital.
 August 19 – Sri Lanka –  Kurunegala train crash: 15 people die when the Udarata Menike train derails due of speeding and overcrowding.
 September 2 – Indonesia – Cirebon: A passenger train and a locomotive collide, killing 40 people and seriously injuring 37.
 September 11 – United States – Amtrak Texas Eagle derails. 
 September 11 – United States – The September 11 attacks forced to stop various full rail networks, including but not limited to the New York City Subway, the Long Island Rail Road, the Washington Metro, and Amtrak (see main article).
 September 13 – United States – Wendover, Utah: The westbound California Zephyr derails after striking a coal train. There were no fatalities, but several injuries.
 November 8 – Russia – A nuclear waste train from Bulgaria crashes at midnight between Krasnoyarsk and Kemerovo on the Trans-Siberian Railway. 14 of the 20 tanker-wagons derail and the line is closed for about 12 hours. One kilometre of track is damaged.
 November 15 – United States – Michigan: Canadian National train E243 running from Flat Rock, MI to Flint, MI collided with another CN train, L533 (bound for Detroit), at the Andersonville Siding on CN's Holly Subdivision. The engineer and conductor on E243 were killed in the accident, and a memorial to them has been erected at Durand Union Station in Durand, MI.
 December 7 — United States – Wyoming: Two BNSF trains collide head-on in Arminto, Wyoming, killing the engineer of the moving train.
 December 18 – Greece – Orestiada: 1 death results when a train becomes stuck in a snow drift and derails near the Bulgarian border. Temperatures fall to −20°C.

2002 
 January 18 – United States – Minot train derailment: A Canadian Pacific train derails at 01:40 CST near a residential area west of Minot, North Dakota. Seven of 15 tank cars rupture, releasing more than 750,000 liters (200,000 US gallons) of anhydrous ammonia which vaporizes in the sub-zero air, forming a toxic cloud that drifts over much of Minot.  One man dies and numerous others are treated for chemical exposure.
 February 6 – South Africa –  2002 Charlotte's Dale train collision: Two commuter trains collide in Charlotte's Dale near Durban. 22 people die, including 16 children.
 February 20 – Egypt – 2002 El Ayyat railway accident: A train packed to double capacity catches fire after a cooking gas cylinder explodes, killing 383 people.
 February 21 – Switzerland – A freight train and a locomotive collide at Chiasso. Two people are killed and three are injured.
 February 27 – India –  Godhra train burning – A Muslim mob sets fire to a Sabarmati Express train, killing 59 people, mainly Hindu pilgrims and karsevaks returning from Ayodhya. The incident led to the 2002 Gujarat riots.
 March 30 - Spain - In Catalonia, a Euromed Express Train collides with another Euromed Express Train making many train cars crushed, 2 people were killed and 100 people were injured.
 April 18 – United States – Crescent City, Florida: 21 cars of an Amtrak Auto-Train derail. Four people were killed and 142 others were injured. The National Transportation Safety Board initial accident report finds that the ECP brakes purchased for the train were not functioning: the final report determines that the accident was caused by a hot-weather "sun kink" misalignment of the track due to inadequate CSX maintenance-of-way, and stated that equipment and track damages totaled about $8.3 million.
 April 23 – United States – 2002 Placentia train collision, In Placentia, California: A BNSF freight train, which ran a stop signal, collides head-on with a Metrolink train near the Atwood Junction, at the intersection of Orangethorpe Avenue and Van Buren Street. Two people die in the crash and twenty-two are seriously injured.
 May 10 – United Kingdom – 2002 Potters Bar rail accident: A northbound WAGN Class 365 train derails at high speed; 7 people die, 11 seriously injured.
 May 13 – India – 2002 Jaunpur train crash: 12 people die when a passenger train derails and crashes in Uttar Pradesh. It is insinuated that the train was sabotaged.
 May 28 — United States — A BNSF coal train and intermodal train collided head-on near the small town of Clarendon, Texas, resulting in the death of the engineer of the intermodal train and the injuries of the coal train's crew and the intermodal train's conductor. It was revealed that the coal train's crew was distracted by their cell phones, ultimately causing their train to collide with the intermodal train.
 May 30 – United States – Hempfield Township, Westmoreland County, Pennsylvania: a freight train of mostly empty cars strikes a vehicle at an ungated crossing, killing two teenagers and injuring two others. Crossing is permanently closed after the accident.
 June 13 – Sri Lanka –  Train derails whilst coming into Alawwa station, killing 14 people.
 June 24 – Tanzania – Igandu train collision: Nearly 300 people die when a passenger train rolls backwards into a goods train.
 July 20 – Italy – Rometta Marea derailment:  The Palermo–Venice train derails in Rometta Marea, Messina, killing eight people.
 July 29 – United States – Kensington, Maryland: The eastbound Amtrak Capitol Limited, train 30, while traversing a CSX route, strikes a sun kink at 1:55 PM while traveling at 60 mph (100 km/h) near milepost 11.78. Several cars go down an embankment and four Superliners overturn against trees. 16 people are seriously injured and 79 people suffer from minor injuries. The misalignment was determined to be caused by an improperly tamped ballast and excessive speed in the 96 °F (35 °C) sunny weather. "Slow orders" were imposed on passenger trains in the area on very hot days following this accident.
 September 9 – Germany – Bad Münder: Two freight trains collide head-on after a brake failure on one of the trains. A tank car loaded with 1-chloro-2,3-epoxypropane explodes, contaminating the station and exposing 96 firemen to carcinogenic fumes.
 September 9 – India – Rafiganj train wreck: More than 130 people die when a passenger train derails and falls into the Dhave River in Bihar because of sabotaged tracks.

 September 15 – United States – 2002 Farragut derailment: A Norfolk Southern freight train derails in Farragut, Tennessee, resulting in a hazardous materials release of fuming sulfuric acid and evacuation of more than 2,600 nearby residents for nearly three days. Damage was estimated at just over one million USD.
 September 27 – United States – Jamaica, New York: Three cars of a JFK Airtrain test train derail near Federal Circle. The train's lone occupant, a train operator testing the automated equipment, is crushed to death by the cement blocks inside the first car. The cement blocks were used to evenly distribute the weight inside the car, simulating the weight of customers when in passenger service. When the train derailed, the cement blocks collapsed onto the operator.
 October 13 – Australia – Benalla level crossing collision, Victoria: A heritage train hauled by K class steam locomotive K 183 collides with a B-Double truck that failed to clear the level crossing. The impact causes the locomotive to derail, rolling onto its side, and the locomotive's tender to be forced into the locomotive's cab. Three of the four people in the cab at the time of the collision are killed and one critically injured.
 November 6 – France – Nancy: A fire breaks out in the front two carriages of an overnight sleeper train heading from Paris to Vienna. 12 passengers die of smoke inhalation, 9 are injured.
November 7 – Denmark – Holte: An empty S-train turning around did not brake in time and drove into the path of another S-train heading to Køge station. A woman was killed and 3 passengers were injured, 2 more seriously.

2003 
 January 3 – India – Ghatnandur train crash: 18 people die in the collision of two trains at Ghatnandur in Maharashtra

 January 10 – China – Tengzhou,Shandong: when the 1227 passenger train from Fuxin to Shanghai undertaken by Shenyang Railway Bureau Jinzhou Passenger Transport Section started from Beijing–Shanghai railway Tengzhou, seven passengers Foodborne illness suddenly died, one of them, Mr. Ma, due to ineffective rescue. The cause of the accident was that the head of the dining car of 1227 passenger trains mistook a bag of Sodium nitrite for White sugar and gave it to Ms. Su, the dining car attendant who sold milk, She told Ms. Su that White sugar can be added when preparing milk, and then Ms. Su sold the milk with Sodium nitrite added to passengers, which caused the accident. The dining car captain and waitress Ms. Su of 1227 passenger train were expelled from the railway and handed over to the judicial authorities for criminal responsibility on suspicion of Negligent homicide. The section chief, secretary, deputy section chief in charge, train captain, secretary, conductor on duty, and police chief of Shenyang Railway Bureau Jinzhou Passenger Depot also received corresponding administrative punishment.
 January 31 – Australia – Waterfall rail accident: The driver of a southbound passenger train suffers a heart attack and dies; the train speeds out of control and derails on a curve, overturning several cars; 6 passengers die.
 February 2 – Zimbabwe – Dete train crash. Two trains collide, derailing and catching fire, killing over 40 people.
 February 3 – Australia – Broadmeadows train runaway and crash, Melbourne, Victoria: An unmanned electric suburban train rolls away from Broadmeadows station and runs for 16.848 kilometres at speeds in excess of 100 km/h through many pedestrian and level crossings before crashing into a stationary Diesel passenger train at Southern Cross station derailing both. No serious injuries result from this incident.
 
 February 18 – South Korea – Daegu subway fire: A mentally ill man starts a fire which engulfs two subway trains, killing 192 people.
 March 20 – Netherlands – Roermond: The driver of an NS passenger train suffers a heart attack, runs through a red signal, collides head-on with a freight train; the driver is killed, six passengers are injured seriously. After passing a distant signal at danger the automatic safety system did not enforce a deceleration large enough to prevent a collision.
 May 6 – United States – The Savannah Morning News reported that Amtrak's Silver Star struck a delivery truck at a private crossing near Hinesville, Georgia killing the engineer and the truck driver.
 May 15 – India – Ladhowal train fire: A passenger train catches fire, 38 people die near Ladhowal in Punjab.
 June 3 – Spain – Chinchilla train collision: 19 people die when a TALGO train and a freight train collide head-on in Albacete.
 June 11 – Germany – 6 people die and 25 are injured when two passenger trains collide head-on near Schrozberg.
 June 23 – India – Vaibhavwadi train crash: 51 people die when a special holiday train derails in Maharashtra.
 July 2 – India – Warangal train crash: 22 people die when a train's brakes fail and it falls off a bridge into a crowded fish market in Warangal.
 July 7 – United Kingdom – Between Evesham and Pershore, Worcestershire, a First Great Western train collides with a minibus on a level crossing, killing 3 people in the minibus.
 August 3 – United Kingdom – A Romney, Hythe and Dymchurch Railway steam train hits a car driven across the level crossing. Steam train driver dies, car driver with passenger and some train passengers are injured.

 August 5 – China – Heilongjiang, Shuangcheng: the SS9 electric locomotive 0069 locomotive of Shenyang Railway Bureau Shenyang locomotive depot pulled the T184 passenger train from Harbin to Hankou to the up line k209+700m between Wujia and An'xi of Beijing–Harbin railway and collided with two cows rushing onto the railway. The accident caused two cows to die on the spot. The connecting pipe of the lower oil tank of an air-conditioning generator behind the machine broke, causing fuel leakage, and the up line driving was interrupted for 27 minutes.
 August 7 – Switzerland – Two trains collide at Gsteigwiler. One person is killed and 63 are injured.
Front locomotive rolls onto its side and catches fire.  45 injured. The engineer is not terminated and continues to work for Metra. This occurs in the same spot and for the same reasons as the 2005 Metra crash.
 October 14 – Ireland – Cahir, County Tipperary. A freight train derails as it is passing over the River Suir, destroying the viaduct. The line is closed until September 2004.
 October 14 – Switzerland – Two express trains collide at Zürich Oerlikon railway station. One person is killed and 45 are injured.
 December 18 – United States – 13 cars on a 96-car CSX freight train from Richmond to Philadelphia derail in Alexandria, Virginia.

2004 
 February 15 – United Kingdom – Tebay rail accident, Cumbria, England. A sleeper (railroad tie) transporter trolley with defective brakes carrying 16 tonnes of rails becomes detached from a maintenance train south of Penrith and rolls down the falling gradient until it strikes and kills 4 workmen in a team repairing the line at Tebay, between Oxenholme and Penrith. The owner of the sleeper transporter truck (a contractor working for Network Rail) is prosecuted.
 February 18 – Iran – Nishapur train disaster: 51 train cars break loose from their siding, roll down the track, derail and roll down an embankment into Khayyam, near Nishapur. During the cleanup operation, the cargo of the cars explode (an equivalent of 180 tons of TNT), killing 295 people and leveling Khayyam and damaging three nearby towns. The blast is felt as far away as Mashhad.
February 21 – Denmark – Tommerup Stationsby: An intercity train travelling to Copenhagen was travelling at 150 km/h when its rear wheels came off the tracks at Tommerup station, due to a broken rail. It was later revealed that the Banestyrelsen had studied the rail tracks in the area 2 years before, and had found that some tracks in the area were up to 33 years old.
 April 16 – Turkey – Temelli: An overnight İzmir-to-Ankara express hits a truck near Ankara, as it crosses a level crossing. 7 to 10 children die and 2 to 5 more are injured according to various reports at the time.
 April 22 – North Korea – Ryongchon disaster: 161 people killed and more than 1000 injured when an explosion takes place.
 May 19 – United States – near Gunter, Texas:  One person dies and four are injured when a BNSF train fails to adhere to an after-arrival track warrant and collides with another train.
June 1 – Denmark – Holstebro: Two regional trains enter the same track and collide head-on. 24 people were injured, 2 more seriously injured.
 June 17 – India – Karanjadi train crash: 20 people die and 100 are injured when 10 carriages fall off a bridge during a monsoon-induced landslide.
 June 28 – United States – Macdona, Texas, near San Antonio: 4 people die and 51 are injured when a Union Pacific train fails to stop at a signal and collides with another train, causing lethal chlorine gas to leak out of a train car.  The UP driver and two local residents living near the tracks die.  Several other residents and many visiting an area SeaWorld theme park are injured seriously by the gas.
 July 22 – Turkey – Pamukova train derailment: An Istanbul–Ankara express with 230 people on board derails at Pamukova, Sakarya Province and the carriages overturn. Turkish government officials confirm 41 dead, another 80 injured.

 August 31 – China – Liaoning, Kaiyuan – the SS9 electric locomotive 0003 locomotive of the Shenyang Railway Bureau Shenyang locomotive depot pulled the 1394 passenger train from Jiamusi to Yantai on the Beijing-Harbin Railway. When the train ran to Zhonggu, because the No.11 Railroad switch was in the reverse position, resulting in a trolley derailment in each of the 5 and 7 carriages behind the locomotive. Fortunately, no casualties, The accident caused the Beijing-Harbin Railway uplink main line to stop running for 3 hours and 56 minutes, which constituted a major accident of passenger train derailment.
 September 10 – Sweden – Nosaby level crossing disaster: A heavy truck is caught between the barriers at a level crossing, and is hit by a passenger train. The 2 drivers die, 47 people are injured. The truck driver was found guilty of not attempting to move the vehicle away from the level crossing, and was sentenced to 14 months' imprisonment.
 November 3 - United States - At Woodley Park train station in Virginia, 2 DC Metro trains collided, 20 people were injured.
 November 6 – United Kingdom – Ufton Nervet rail crash: A First Great Western InterCity 125 hits a stationary car on a level crossing (an apparent suicide) at 100 mph (160 km/h) and derails. Five train passengers and the drivers of both the train and the car die; more than 100 passengers are injured.
 November 11 – United States – San Antonio, Texas: A Union Pacific train derails off the tracks in an industrial district, killing one man working in a warehouse office and injuring others.
 November 15 – Australia – Cairns Tilt Train derailment: The world's fastest narrow-gauge train derails at 112 km/h. No one is killed or permanently injured. The accident is blamed on the train travelling too fast on a curved line.
 November 29 – United States – Zephyrhills, Florida: Two CSX freight trains collide in early morning fog at Vitis Junction, killing one and injuring three.
 December 3 – Italy – Two trains collide at Castellaneta after one of them passes a red signal. 20 people are injured, two seriously.
 December 14 – India – Two passenger trains collide in Punjab. Twenty-seven people are killed, more than 50 are injured.
 December 26 – Sri Lanka – 2004 Sri Lanka tsunami train wreck: Approximately 1700 people die in the world's worst rail disaster as a train is overwhelmed by a tsunami created by the 2004 Indian Ocean earthquake.

2005 

 January 6 – United States – Graniteville train crash: 9 people (including the engineer) died and 250+ were injured when a 42-car Norfolk Southern freight train collided head-on with a parked local freight train near the Avondale Mills plant in Graniteville, South Carolina. 16 cars (including a tank car that ruptured 90 tons of chlorine gas into the air) derailed in the accident, leading to the 9 deaths and 250+ injuries. The NTSB determined that the cause of the accident was the failure of the local freight's crew members to realign the switch for mainline operations.
 January 7 – Italy – Crevalcore train crash. A passenger train running from Verona to Bologna fails to stop at a red light and collides head-on with a freight train, near Crevalcore. There was dense fog at the time of the accident. 17 die.
 January 17 – Thailand – an empty MRT (Bangkok) train returning to the depot collided with another train filled with passengers at the Thailand Cultural Centre MRT Station. 140 people were hurt, most of whom sustained only minor injuries, and the entire Metro network was shut down for two weeks. See MRT accident
 January 26 – United States – 2005 Glendale train crash: In a planned suicide attempt in which the suspect changes his mind, a southbound Metrolink double-deck commuter train collides in Glendale, California with the man's vehicle that he has driven onto the tracks and then abandoned.  The southbound train derails, then strikes both a moving northbound Metrolink train on the adjacent track as well as a parked Union Pacific freight train on a siding. 11 people die, about 100 injured.
 February 3 – India – Nagpur level crossing disaster. A tractor-trailer carrying a wedding party is hit by a train. 55 wedding guests die.
 February 9 – Latvia – A Lielvarde-Riga passenger train collides with empty stock heading for Riga train depot, killing four people and injuring 32. Official report states that the conductor had missed the red signal.
 February 14 — United States – Oxnard, California. An Amtrak Pacific Surfliner passenger train traveling from Los Angeles Union Station collided with a semi-truck loaded with strawberries at the Rice Avenue grade crossing. The truck driver, who had stopped at the crossing, suddenly encountered a green traffic light that conflicted the crossing gates coming down. This confused the driver, who started crossing the tracks then, but the traffic light suddenly turned red after a few seconds, making the truck driver stop without realising that the rest of her truck was still on the tracks. The train was traveling too fast to stop in time and completely destroyed the truck's trailer, severely damaging the locomotive and spilling diesel fuel at the crash site. No one was killed, but a few passengers of the train had minor injuries.
February 14  – Denmark – Lyngby: An S-train to Høje Tåstrup runs into a stopped S-train which was heading for Køge at 60–70 km/h. 2 passengers and a driver were seriously injured. Snow which had settled on the signals made them difficult to read, meaning the train could not be stopped in time.
 February 28 – Sweden – Ledsgard. A chlorine tanker train derails due to brake failure after they were wrongly set to "empty". The line was closed for 2 weeks.
 March 11 -United States – Rochelle, Illinois: A collision took place between a Loram rail grinding work train, and a BNSF transportation freight train. The accident occurred at the at-grade crossing of Union Pacific and BNSF tracks.
 April 21 – India – Vadodara train crash: Collision between freight and passenger express train; 18 people die.

 April 25 – Japan – Amagasaki rail crash: A train derails on sharp curve and smashes into an apartment building. 107 people die, 549 are injured. Investigation shows the driver (who was among the dead) was speeding because of a slight delay.
 April 26 – Sri Lanka – Polgahawela level crossing collision: A bus tries to beat the train at a level crossing; at least 35 people die, all on the bus.
 May 5 – United States – Galt, Illinois: A Union Pacific train derails and destroys the  Transcontinental mainline bridge at Elkhorn creek.
 May 19 – Indonesia – Bandar Lampung: A passenger train from Palembang crashes into another passenger train at Bandar Lampung station and derails. 7 children die and just under 200 were injured. Human error is blamed for the accident and many of the dead are passengers clinging on to the sides of the Palembang train. The Indonesian government begins a crackdown on people clinging on to the exteriors of trains as a means of travel.
The crash was blamed on poor track maintenance.
 June 20 – China  – Guangdong, Heyuan: The T186 passenger train from Shenzhen to Shenyang Bei stopped at Baitian Station of Beijing–Kowloon railway in an emergency. Because the railway line 20 kilometers in front of Baitian Station was washed away by floods and was impassable, the T186 passenger train was forced to return to Shenzhen for standby after being detained for nearly a day. At 21:13 on June 24, the T186 passenger train left Shenzhen on schedule again and arrived at Shenyang Bei 36 hours and 25 minutes later.
At least 7 die and more than 200 are injured.
 July 10 – United States – Anding, Mississippi: Two Canadian National freight trains collide head-on after the northbound train fails to stop at a red light. Both crews die upon impact.
 July 10 – United Kingdom – A Romney, Hythe & Dymchurch Railway steam train hits a car driven across a level crossing. Steam train driver dies, car driver and train passengers are uninjured.
 July 13 – Pakistan – 2005 Ghotki rail crash: A chain reaction accident caused by one train missing a signal and colliding into another results in three trains crashed and over 150 people dead.
 July 26 – Austria – Gramatneusiedl: passenger train of the ÖBB crashes into a cargo train, injuring 13 people.
 July 31 – China  – Liaoning, Shenyang: the SS9 electric locomotive 0089 locomotive depot pulled the K127 passenger train from Xi'an to Changchun passes a sabotaged railway signal and collides with a freight train, killing 5 passengers. Officials state that some wiring was stolen from a nearby signal box causing the signal to malfunction.
 August 1 – Greece – Kilkis: a truck driver is struck by a train on a crossing and dies. The driver ignored crossing warnings.
 August 2 – United States – Raleigh, North Carolina. Two people are killed when their truck is hit by an Amtrak train.  The driver bypassed safety barriers.
 August 5 – Canada – Cheakamus River derailment: Nine cars of a Canadian National freight train derail into the Cheakamus River near Whistler, British Columbia. 40,000 litres of caustic soda enter the river, killing over 500,000 fish and greatly damaging the surrounding ecosystem.
 September 17 – United States – Chicago, Illinois: A Metra commuter train derails, killing two and injuring 83.
 October 3 – India – Datia rail accident: 100 die when a train travelling at six times the speed limit derails.
 October 15 – United States – Texarkana, Arkansas, Union Pacific train rear-ends another train, derailing and puncturing a tank car containing propylene. The leak reaches an ignition source at a nearby house, causing a massive explosion and subsequent fire. A  radius is evacuated, and one resident is killed.
 October 23 – Italy – Eurostar 9410 derailment: Eurostar Italia train 9410, running from Taranto to Milan, derails between Acquaviva delle Fonti and Sannicandro di Bari when subsidence due to heavy rain causes a bridge to collapse under it, leaving two bare rails spanning the 12-meter-deep ravine. The train completes the crossing and comes to rest with its rear end suspended over the void. Nobody dies.
 October 26 – South Africa – The passenger train Shosholoza Meyl collides head-on with the stationary Blue Train at Deelfontein station just outside De Aar in the Northern Cape. Both trains derail. The Blue Train has much more damage than the Shosholoza Meyl. This particular set of the Blue Train (there are two sets) stayed out of service for the next two years.
 October 29 – India – Veligonda train disaster: At least 114 people die and many more are injured when part of the track is swept away by a flood, causing a train to derail.
 November 17 – China  – Liaoning, Jinzhou: the SS9 electric locomotive locomotive depot pulled the K27 passenger train from Beijing to Dandong on the Qinhuangdao–Shenyang passenger railway, the train uses China Railways 25G rolling stock car body. When the train ran to the section from Jinzhou South to Panjin North, due to the fire in the fuel furnace at the rear of the second air-conditioning generator car behind the train, the use of fire extinguisher was ineffective, and the conductor of the train inspection used the emergency brake valve to stop, It caused the burning of the working support contact network of No. 759 ~ 761 downline of Qinhuangdao–Shenyang passenger railway, and the burns of the working and non support cables and non support contact lines; One carriage is damaged; No casualties were caused. By 5:10 on the same day, the operation of the down line was interrupted for 4 hours and 20 minutes, which constituted a major passenger train fire accident. The cause of the accident was that the stewards of the generator car did not check the equipment as required, so that the leakage of the oil delivery pipe of the fuel boiler of the generator car could not be handled in time, resulting in the occurrence of the accident.
 November 23 – Turkey – At 6.30 am a train hits a truck on a level crossing between Tarsus and Mersin. 9 people die and 18 are injured.
 November 29 – Democratic Republic of Congo – Kindu rail accident: Over 60 people are swept off the roof of a train by the beams of a bridge in Maniema province.
 December 19 - Poland - Świnna rail crash: After loss of braking power in EN57-840 EMU operating as passenger train from Sucha Beskidzka to Żywiec, the cooperation between the train crew, train dispatcher in Jeleśnia and crew of another passenger train coming from Żywiec results in controlled collision in Świnna, Silesian Voivodeship. 8 people are injured, there are no fatalities.
 December 25 – Japan – Shonai, Yamagata: All 6 cars of Akita–Niigata Inaho express train derail and three passenger cars are crushed, 5 people die and 32 are injured. Strong winter winds are thought to be the cause.

2006 
 January 6 – United States – Possum Point, Virginia: A broken CSX rail causes Virginia Railway Express Train #304 to derail. The last 3 of the 6 cars derailed but did not fall over. NTSB finds that CSX failed to post speed restrictions and repair/replace the track in a timely fashion. There are only a few minor injuries.

 January 23 – Montenegro (then within Serbia and Montenegro) – Bioče train disaster: A passenger train crashes into a ravine near Podgorica, killing 46 people and injuring 198.
 January 29 – Pakistan – A broken rail causes a derailment near Jhelum in Punjab, killing 2 people and injuring 29. Poor maintenance is officially being cited as cause of the accident; sabotage is suspected by some authorities. The government inquiry later blames defective and aging rails.
 February 17 – Canada – High winds derail six Canadian Pacific freight cars on the Saint-Laurent Railway Bridge between Montreal and Kahnawake, Quebec, leaving them dangling precariously over the water. It takes several days to remove the cars, disrupting rail service.
 March 13 – United States – Austin, Texas: Tara Rose McAvoy, 18, the reigning Miss Deaf Texas, is killed by the snowplow on a 65-car Union Pacific freight train while trespassing on the tracks and text-messaging her parents. The train sounds its horn repeatedly and attempts to apply the emergency brakes but did not stop in time.
 April 5 – United States – Indian Orchard, Massachusetts: Patrick Deans, 18, high-school football player, is struck and killed by a CSX freight train while trespassing on the tracks. Two CSX trains are passing at the time. Patrick escapes one train and is struck by the other.
 April 15 – Indonesia – Gubug, Java: 13 people die and 26 are injured as two trains collide and wreckage falls into a paddy field. One Swiss man is among the injured. Human error by the driver is officially blamed.
 April 28 – Australia – Victoria: A V/Line VLocity high-speed train is derailed when struck by an 18-wheeler truck, killing 2 people and injuring 28 on the Ballarat-to-Ararat line.
 May 17 – Switzerland – An engineering train suffers a brake failure and crashes at Thun. Three people are killed.
 May 25 – Australia – Lismore, Victoria: A truck fails to stop at level crossing, derailing trains and causing massive pileup of wagons. Mist/fog is factor.
 June 12 – Israel – Netanya: A passenger train from Tel Aviv to Haifa derails after colliding with a lorry on a level crossing, killing 5 people and injuring more than 100.
 June 14 – United States – Kismet, California. Two BNSF freight trains collide head-on due to one of the trains running a red signal. 5 people were injured. One of the train's crews, the one that ran the red, is suspected to be high on cocaine. There was a camera on board one of the locomotives involved in the collision; the Federal Railroad Administration, who investigated the crash instead of the National Transportation Safety Board as usual, released the video of the collision which is widely available on YouTube and related sites. All but one of the locomotives involved, despite heavy damage and being near-totalled, were repaired and returned to service after the accident.
 July 1 – United States – Abington, Pennsylvania. Two SEPTA Regional Rail passenger trains collided on a single track on the Warminster Line, injuring three dozen.
 July 3 – Spain – Valencia Metro derailment: A Valencia Metro train derails after leaving Jesús station, killing 41 people and injuring at least 47. The records of the train's black box show that the train passed a bend at 80 km/h, above the speed limit of 40 km/h.
 August 18 – India – Two carriages catch fire on the Chennai-Hyderabad Express near Secunderabad station.
 August 21 – Egypt – Qalyoub train collision – Two trains collide in the town of Qalyoub, 12 miles (20 kilometers) north of Cairo, killing 57 people and injuring 128.
 August 21 – Spain – A speeding eastbound RENFE intercity train derails in Villada, 40 km west of Palencia, leaving six people dead and 36 injured.
 August 27 – Zimbabwe – 5 people die in a head-on collision between a passenger train and a freight train 30 km south of Victoria Falls.
 September 4 – Egypt – A passenger train collides with a freight train north of Cairo, killing five people and injuring 30.
 September 5 – Netherlands – A diesel locomotive passes a red signal and collides with a passenger train at Amersfoort. 17 people are injured. 

 September 22 – Germany – Lathen train collision: 21 passengers and two maintenance workers die and many more are injured when a Transrapid train collides with a maintenance of way vehicle on the system's test track near the Netherlands border.

 October 9 - United States – Cactus train collision: A BNSF coal train is accidentally switched to a siding with 54 freight cars on it. The footage is widely available on YouTube and other related sites, much like the Kismet train collision.
 October 11 – France – Zoufftgen train collision: Passenger and freight trains collide head-on at Zoufftgen, Moselle, close to the Luxembourg border. 5 people die, including the drivers of both trains, and 20 are injured. The accident is ascribed to human error in the controlling signalling centre in Luxembourg.
 October 17 – Italy – 2006 Rome metro crash: Two metro trains collide at Rome's Vittorio Emanuele metro station, killing at least one person and injuring around 60.
 October 20 – United States – New Brighton, Pennsylvania: A Norfolk Southern unit train of DOT-111 tank cars containing ethanol derails on a bridge over the Beaver River. The resulting fire burns for days and forces some evacuations.
 November 9 – United States – Baxter, California: Six cars of a runaway maintenance train derail, killing two of the crew.
 November 13 – South Africa – Faure level crossing accident: A Metrorail train smashes into a truck carrying farm workers at a level crossing, killing 27 people.
 November 20 – India – 2006 West Bengal train explosion: A train traveling between New Jalpaiguri and Haldiburi in West Bengal explodes, killing five people and injuring 25 to 66. Terrorism is suspected.
 November 20 – Netherlands – A train passes a red signal causing a head-on collision in Rotterdam. The passenger train is empty and none are injured; there is extensive damage to the rail track and its overhead power lines
 November 24 – Croatia – Drniš: HŽ ICN tilting train number 521 collides with a lorry loaded with Knauf cement boards at the railroad crossing that is not equipped with ramp or warning lights. Train engineer dies instantly, the lorry driver sustains severe injuries and survives. Train composition suffers major damage and is subsequently written off the Croatian Railways' rolling stock.
 November 30 – United States – North Baltimore, Ohio: 15 cars carrying steel derail when the train inadvertently switches to a side track. These cars then impact a coal train on a parallel set of tracks, causing four of its cars to also derail.  The PUCO blames the accident on a chain hanging from one of the rolling stock, which engaged a switch handle on the tracks, causing a shift of the rails.  Three people who were in vehicles waiting for the train to pass are injured as a result of the accident, none seriously.
 December 1 – India – Bihar, Bhágalpur: In the Ganges a portion of the 150-year-old 'Ulta Pul' bridge being dismantled collapses over a passing train of India's Eastern Railways, killing 35 people and injuring 17.
 December 13 – Italy – Avio: A freight train operated by Trenitalia passes a red signal and crashes on a freight train of the private company Rail Traction Company. Two Trenitalia engineers die in the violent crash

2007 
 January 4 – Turkey – A freight train crashes into a truck carrying farm workers at a railroad crossing in Hatay Province, killing 7 people and injuring 19.
 January 16 – United States – Brooks derailment: A CSX freight train derails in Brooks, Kentucky.
 January 16 – United States – East Rochester, New York: A 13-car CSX intermodal train carrying retail goods partially derailed, spilling at least five containers and two intermodal wells onto the road below an overpass.
 January 16 – Indonesia – The Senja Bengawan train derails in Central Java, resulting in five fatalities.

 February 2 – United Kingdom – Grayrigg derailment: A Virgin Trains West Coast Pendolino service from London Euston to Glasgow Central derails at Grayrigg Cottage near Oxenholme, Cumbria, United Kingdom. One woman dies. A set of points is thought to be the cause of the accident; the West Coast Main Line is closed for several days.
 February 28 – China – Wind blows 10 passenger rail cars off the track near Turpan, killing 3 passengers and seriously injuring 2 others.
 May 2 – Ukraine – 32 passengers are injured as the "Stolichniy Express" high-speed train derails near Kyiv. Sabotage is suspected but investigation reveals that technicians tried and failed to quick-repair a switch in front of the approaching train.
 June 14 – Croatia – A Croatian HŽ commuter train bound from Zagreb to Karlovac collided with a lorry on the railroad crossing in Demerje. The lorry driver died instantly while the train engineer died during the rescue workers' attempt to get him out of the wreckage. The crash was caused by the lorry driver who ignored light and bell warnings about the incoming train. The train conductor sustained minor injuries.mThe locomotive No. 987811413846 suffered huge frontal structural damage, but was later repaired and put back into service.
 June 15 – Italy –  Two trains collided on Sardinia, killing 3.
 July 16–17 – United States – Two Amtrak Silver Star trains on the Tampa to Miami route crash into automobiles and derail in two separate instances, one in Lakeland and one in Plant City. Four people in the automobile die in the first wreck; one in the automobile dies in the second accident. Nobody on either train is seriously injured.
 July 16 – Ukraine – 15 carriages from a train carrying yellow phosphorus derail and catch fire, releasing toxic fumes affecting 14 villages in a  area near Lviv.
 August 1 – Democratic Republic of the Congo – Benaleka train accident: A passenger train derails killing about 100 people and injuring more than 200 others, many riding on the roof in Kasai-Occidental province, as a result of brake failure.
 August 7 – India – 32 passengers are injured when the Jodhpur-Howrah Express derails near Juhi Bridge, Kanpur.
 August 24 – Serbia – Two persons die and five are injured when a locomotive and a freight train collide near Čortanovci.
 August 30 – Brazil – 2007 Rio de Janeiro train collision: 8 passengers die and 80 are injured when a commuter train collides with an empty train at Nova Iguaçu near Rio de Janeiro.
 October 3 – United States – Moving over the CSX east coast main line, the Amtrak Silver Meteor collided into a tractor-trailer after it attempted to cross a grade crossing in Port Wentworth, Georgia. No serious injuries are reported.
 October 10 – United States – A CSX train Q380-09 carrying ethanol and butane derails in Painesville and Painesville Township, Ohio, causing an evacuation and fire that takes several days to burn out. Broken rail is suspected as the cause.
 October 22 – United States – A Vermont Railway train carrying gasoline derails in Middlebury, Vermont, causing an evacuation. At least one car catches fire and several others leak gasoline into Otter Creek (Vermont).
 October 25 – Sweden – A 15-year-old boy dies when he is struck by a high speed train in Solna while illegally crossing the railway.
 October 29 – United States – Two BNSF trains derail in Clara City, Minnesota, causing a hydrochloric acid spill that prompts the evacuation of about 350 people.
 November 3 – South Korea – Two Korea Train Express trains collide inside Busan Station, with no casualties.
 November 9 – United States – CSX train derailment in the District of Columbia dumps 10 rail cars of coal in the Anacostia River. Improperly secured, a free-rolling cut of hoppers from Bennington Yard rolls onto an out-of-service bridge, which collapses.
 November 30 – United States – Amtrak train No. 371, the Pere Marquette, strikes the last car of COFC freight train on the Norfolk Southern (ex-PRR) line near 65th Street in Chicago. Two people in the cab of P42DC No. 8 are injured, and many passengers are injured, including three critical. The crumple zone design of the locomotive is effective and prevents worse results. The unit is subsequently scrapped. 
 
 December 10 – China  – Beijing, Daxing: at 14:30, Between Beijing-Shanghai railway Huangtupo and Huangcun, the foreman of a work area, Mr. Tong, led Mr. Yao, Mr. Li and Mr. Zhang to measure the catenary equipment under the bridge and clear the snow. At 14:40, when Mr. Zhang was measuring the catenary parameters, he was hit by the K215 passenger train from Beijing to Tumen pulled by DF4D diesel locomotive, and died on the spot.

2008 
 January 24 – China – Hunan, Guangdong - the T238 passenger train from Guangzhou East to Harbin encountered snow disaster in southern China in Beijing–Guangzhou railway Hunan and Guangdong. Because the ice and snow collapsed the power grid, the train pulled by electric locomotive could not move forward, causing the train to be delayed 73 hours and 28 minutes.
 January 24 – China – Hunan, Guangdong - the T124 passenger train from Guangzhou to Changchun encountered snow disaster in southern China along the Beijing–Guangzhou railway. Because the ice and snow collapsed the power grid, the train pulled by electric locomotive could not move forward, causing the train to be delayed for six days and seven nights.
 February 1 – United Kingdom – East Midlands Connect train from Nottingham to Norwich strikes a footbridge in its path at Barrow-on-Soar. A road vehicle had struck and damaged the bridge causing it to be foul of the line. Six passengers are on board; the driver has to be cut free from the driving cab. In October 2011, Network Rail is fined £80,000 and ordered to pay costs of £32,000.
The rural crossing has seen five other crashes, two of which were fatal, since 1984. An FRA safety review is now planned for this crossing. The other fatalities were on October 10, 1984, and February 7, 1986, between a train and a truck, in which both truck drivers and the truck's passenger in the 1984 crash died.
 February 28 – Bulgaria – Sofia – Kardam train fire – Nine people die in a fire on board Bulgarian State Railways train No.2637 travelling from Sofia to the north-eastern town of Kardam in Dobrich region. The fire starts in a couchette carriage with 35 people in it as the train enters the town of Cherven bryag around midnight, and spreads to a sleeping coach with 27 people. The fire takes more than three hours to extinguish. Among the victims of the fire is Rasho Rashev, the director of Bulgaria's National Archaeological Institute. Bulgarian government declares March 5, 2008 a day of mourning in memory of the victims of the deadly fire.
 March 1 – United Kingdom – Containers are blown off a train by wind between Tring and Cheddington; also Shap.
 March 8 – Greece – An Alexandroupolis-bound InterCity train derailed  outside Larissa, injuring 28 of 174 passengers. Initial reports indicated human error when the station master failed to change the points after a previous train had passed through the station, causing five carriages from the passenger train to jump the tracks. The two drivers of the derailed train were taken in for questioning, and the station master fled the scene.
 March 9 – Argentina – A Ferrobaires passenger train going from Buenos Aires to Mar del Plata strikes an El Rápido Argentino bus going from Mar de Ajó to San Miguel (Greater Buenos Aires) at a crossing on the outskirts of Dolores, Buenos Aires Province. The bus had disregarded the active warning devices on the railroad crossing of Provincial Highway 63. 17 people die, 40 are injured.
 March 17 – United States – A BNSF train crashes into a big rig, causing some of the locomotives to derail in Marysville, Washington.
 March 25 – United States – A MBTA train crashes into a runaway box car at Canton Junction station in Canton, Massachusetts, injuring 150 people on board.
 April 9 – Malaysia – A Sabah State Railway train plunges 10 metres into Padas River after derailment caused by a landslide near Tenom, killing 2 passengers.
 April 14 - Czech Republic - In Ostrava, two trams collide head-on, killing 3 people and injuring 40.

 April 26 – Germany – An InterCityExpress train runs into a herd of sheep that had wandered onto the tracks at the mouth of the Landrückentunnel, Germany's longest rail tunnel, on the Hanover-Würzburg high-speed rail line near Fulda. The derailed train stops  into the tunnel, 22 are injured seriously, including the engineer, 17 slightly and 77 sheep die.
 April 28 – China – Zibo train collision: Train No. T195 carrying approximately 1200 passengers from Beijing to Qingdao derails at a section of temporary detour tracks Zhoucun-Wangcun, Hejiacun, on the outskirts of Zibo, Shandong at approximately 4:38am. It is then struck by the No. 5034 (Yantai to Xuzhou) passenger train at approximately 4:41am, also with approximately 1200 passengers aboard. The detour tracks had a lower speed limit of 80 km/h, but the speed limit was not delivered to T195's operation monitor system or driver, and the driver was following the regular speed limit; T195 was running at the regular speed of 131 km/h before it derailed. Fourteen passenger cars are crushed, 72 people die and 416 are injured.
 May 5 – Sudan – A 20-car freight train carrying illegal passengers and including Kordofan University students derails on the outskirts of Al-Foula, South Kordofan, killing 14 and injuring 28.
 May 10 – Romania – The locomotive and three cars of Romanian National Railway Company (CFR) passenger train No 1661 going from Bucharest to Iași derails at a defective switch near Valea Calugareasca station in Prahova county around 16:55 local time.  Two of the cars are severely damaged.  The train's speed is 68 km/h, below the 70 km/h maximum speed limit on that sector of 70 km/h.  A 17-year-old girl is killed and four other persons are injured.

 May 28 – United States – 2008 Massachusetts train collision:  Boston MBTA Green Line D Train crashes into the rear of another train on the same line in Newton, Massachusetts, between Woodland and Waban "T" stops. The driver of the rear train is killed, and 12 others are injured.
 July 3 – Belgium – a passenger train and a freight train collide. Forty-two people are injured, two seriously.
 July 16 – Egypt – At least 44 people are killed and 33 injured when a truck fails to stop at level crossing and pushes two vehicles into a Matruh–Alexandria passenger train, at El Dabaa, Marsa Matruh.
 July 19 – United Kingdom – An Arriva Trains Wales Class 158 train crashes into a tractor on the Shrewsbury-to-Chester Line

 August 8 – Czech Republic – 2008 Studénka train wreck: Express train EC 108 Comenius from Kraków, Poland to Prague travelling at 140 km/h crashes around 10:30 local time (GMT+1) into a section of a bridge undergoing construction that had fallen onto the track. Eight people are killed and 91 injured.
 September 11 – United Kingdom-France – 2008 Channel Tunnel fire: A Eurotunnel Shuttle train carrying two vans and 25 lorries is severely damaged when a fire starts on one of the lorries. Six people are injured slightly, the part of the Channel Tunnel where the train came to rest is closed for repairs until February 2009.

 September 12 – United States – 2008 Chatsworth train collision: A northbound Metrolink (Southern California) double-deck commuter train runs a red light and collides head-on with a Union Pacific Railroad freight train pulled by three engines at about 60 mph and derails; the 220-ton derailed Metrolink engine is knocked  backwards into a 119-ton passenger car, crushing it in half.  25 people are killed and about 135 are injured in the accident. This incident intensified the debate Congress was considering to mandate a safety system called positive train control, which passed Congress, and was signed into law, just over 30 days after this incident.
 September 29 – India –  Yelagiri Express derails at Tirupattur in Tamil Nadu. The engine and three coaches attached to the Yelagiri Express derailed at Tirupattur, owing to a snag in the engine, disrupting train services for more than three hours. As there were no passengers, a major casualty was averted.
 October 6 – Hungary – Monorierdő train collision: Four people die and 26 are injured in a collision between two passenger trains near Budapest.
 October 6 – United Kingdom – A Mendip Rail freight train is hit from behind by a runaway train near Great Elm on the private line from Whatley Quarry, Somerset. There are no serious injuries.
 October 11 – Netherlands – Thalys trainset 4536 running between Paris and Amsterdam collides with a Koploper ICM unit near Gouda. A steam train hauled by a BR 23 2-6-2 locomotive, which had its route set into the path of the collision, makes a successful emergency stop.
 October 14 – United States – A late night CSX train derails in Decatur, Alabama, killing its conductor.
 November 18 – Australia – A Connex Melbourne express train collides with a car in Dandenong South, killing the car's 53-year-old female occupant after she failed to stop at an active level crossing.
 November 20 – United States – A 119-car CSX coal train derails under and damages the Crain Avenue bridge in Kent, Ohio. No injuries.
 November 27 – Australia – Two people die and several others injured after a QR Tilt Train collides with a truck on the Bruce Highway level crossing about 20 km south of Cardwell, Queensland.
 December 15 – United States – Marysville, Washington: An Amtrak train headed southbound to Portland, Oregon, strikes a Honda Accord and puts the driver in critical condition.
 December 23 – Latvia – A fuel cargo train crashes into a stationary train in Ventspils. Ten fuel tankers catch fire, two people die.
 December 31 – Canada – 33 cars of a 115-car Canadian National Railway freight train running from Toronto to Moncton derail at 23:30 in Villeroy, Quebec.  One car leaks propane, causing the evacuation of about 70 residents.

2009 
 January 1 – Australia – One person is killed and six others injured after a QR Sunlander train collides with a garbage truck at a level crossing with no boom gates or warning lights, near Innisfail, Queensland.
 January 7 – United States – A half-mile radius area is evacuated after a derailment of a CSX train in Queensgate, Cincinnati, Ohio. Two of the four derailed cars are carrying propane, nothing leaked.
 February 13 – India – Jajpur derailment: 12 carriages of the Howrah-Madras Express derail soon after the train departs Jajpur Road station near Bhubaneswar in Odisha, killing 9 people and injuring 250.
 February 21 – Slovakia – Brezno train accident: Eleven people die in a collision between a bus and a train on a level crossing near Brezno.
 March 29 – Tanzania – Equipment breakdown and culpability causes a rear-end collision in Gulwe–Igandu section (Mpwapwa District), killing dozens of passengers and injuring many others.
 April 17 – Germany – A passenger train collides with a freight train in Berlin. Twelve people are injured.
April 28 - United States - In Boston, a T-Trolley train derailed due to the Train Driver looking at text messages, 68 people were injured.
 June 1- United States - In Louisville, Kentucky, a train derailed at a curve in Louisville Zoo, 22 people were injured.
 June 5 – Canada – A 111-car Canadian Pacific Railway train derails in Oshawa, ON around 2:15 p.m. CDT. Two locomotives and 27 cars of the train derail, some of the cars come to rest in nearby backyards and a schoolyard during recess.
 June 19 – United States – A major downpour of rain in Rockford, Illinois, causes 14 of the 114 ethanol tankers of a Canadian National freight train to leave the track and explode into flames. One person at a rail crossing dies, several others are burned.

 June 22 – United States – June 2009 Washington Metro train collision – On the Washington Metro, an electronic track-circuit module fails, causing a train to go undetected by the automatic train control system. A second train crashes into it, killing 9 people, the deadliest incident in the subway system's 33-year history.

 June 29 – Italy – Viareggio train derailment: A freight train derails at Viareggio. Two wagons carrying liquefied petroleum gas explode, killing 32, including five when a house collapses.
 June 29 – China – Chenzhou train collision: Two passenger trains collide at 2:34 a.m. local time at Chenzhou railway station, Hunan Province, killing 3 people and leaving 63 injured. The accident is allegedly caused by a brake failure, which is disputed.
 July 5 - United States – Two monorails at Walt Disney World collide, killing 1; the cause was found to be human error.
 July 9 – United States – The Amtrak Wolverine hits the side of a car in Canton Township, Michigan, near Detroit. All five people in the vehicle die.

 July 18 - United States - In San Francisco, California, a Muni Metro Train collided rear end onto another train that is stopped at West Portal Train Station, 47 people were injured.
 July 24 – Croatia – Rudine derailment – HŽ ICN tilting train number 521 bound from Zagreb to Split derails at 10:08 GMT between Labin Dalmatinski and Kaštel Stari near the village of Rudine. 6 passengers die, 55 are injured, 13 of them seriously. The crash is caused by retardant that was sprayed on the railroad approximately 10 minutes before the accident, leaving the track surface slippery, which made braking impossible. 30 minutes after the crash, during the rescue operation, a rescue train experiences the same problem and derails on the very same spot. There are no further injuries or deaths, although the second train passes close to dozens of rescue workers and collides with the derailed wreckage. The ICN trainset has been written off due to the extreme damage.
 July 29 – China – A train runs off the line due to landslide at 4:22 a.m. local time in Liucheng, Guangxi, killing 4 people and leaving 71 injured.
 August 28 – Cameroon – A freight train carrying fuel derails south of Yaoundé and catches fire. Eleven wagons carrying diesel fuel and petrol are destroyed. One person dies.
 August 30 – Cameroon – A passenger train derails near Yaoundé, killing five and injuring 275.
 September 12 – Germany – Friedewald train collision – Two steam trains collide head-on on the Lößnitzgrundbahn.
 September 16 – Ireland – A tram and bus collide in Dublin injuring 21 people.
 September 24 – Netherlands – Barendrecht train accident – Two freight trains collide head-on below a viaduct on the A15 motorway near Barendrecht, killing the driver of one train. Derailed sections land on a parallel track, where a passenger train is approaching. A few passengers of the passenger train are lightly injured.
 September 30 – China - China Railway Bridge Bureau in the construction of lifting and placing reinforcement cages in the vicinity of Tianjin–Qinhuangdao high-speed railway and Tianjin–Shanhaiguan railway, the tilt of the crane caused the reinforcement cages to invade the uplink, and collided with the 1230 passenger train from Fuxin to Shanghai pulled by the No. 0243 locomotive of the DF4D diesel locomotive of the China Railway Bridge Bureau Tianjin locomotive depot, causing the head of the No. 0243 locomotive of the DF4D diesel locomotive to be damaged, The locomotive steward took emergency stop measures about 100 meters in front of him, but still collided with him, constituting a general class C railway accident.
 October 5 – Thailand – A passenger train derails in Hua Hin District at 04:50 local time (21:50 on October 4 UTC). At least seven people die and dozens are injured. Occurs during heavy rain.

 October 20 – India – Mathura train collision – A passenger train collision near Mathura.
 October 21 – India – 22 passengers die and around 17 are injured when a Goa Express runs into the last coach of a stationary Mewar Express. Later, it is determined that the signalling system was tampered with.
 October 23 – India – Thane train accident. – A huge concrete slab comes crashing down just before a train is about to run below it in northeast Mumbai on Friday morning, killing the driver and a commuter. Twelve other people are also injured in the accident.
 October 24 – Egypt – 2009 El Ayyat railway accident – A passenger train was stopped after striking water buffalo in the El Ayyat area of Giza. Another passenger train, travelling in the same direction, later runs into the back of the stationary train, resulting in the deaths of at least 18 people.
 November 4 – Pakistan – At least 18 people die after a passenger train, Allama Iqbal Express, collides head-on with a goods train in the suburbs of Karachi. The driver of the Allama Iqbal Express passed a stop signal at Juma Goth Station and rammed into another train from Karachi on the same track.
 November 16 – Ireland – An IE 29000 Class diesel multiple unit is derailed near , when it strikes a landslip obstructing the line.
 November 24 – United States – 116 cars of a Union Pacific Railroad train derail in southwest Houston, Texas, forcing the closure of several lanes of Alternate U.S. Highway 90 for several days.
 December 21 – Croatia – An early morning HŽ commuter train number 5100 bound from Sisak Caprag to Zagreb fails to stop and crashes into the platform bumper at Zagreb Glavni Kolodvor in Zagreb at 15–20 km/h. The cause of the crash, which occurred at the very end of its journey, is lack of antifreeze fluid in the locomotive's braking system which froze due to the low outside temperature (−22 °C). The crash occurs at 5:26 local time (4:26 GMT). 60 people from the train (including the train's engineer) are injured, 7 of them seriously. There are no injuries among people on the platform. Witnesses report that the engineer leaned out of the locomotive window to warn people on the platform that his brakes have failed and the train would crash at the end of the platform.

See also 
 Classification of railway accidents
 List of train accidents by death toll
 List of road accidents – includes level crossing accidents.
 List of road accidents 2000–2009
 List of level crossing accidents
 List of British rail accidents
 List of Indian rail accidents
 List of Russian rail accidents
 List of rail accidents by country
 Years in rail transport
 2006 in rail transport
 Tram accident
 Federal Employers Liability Act

References

External links 
 NTSB Reports – The United States National Transportation Safety Board official reports of transportation accidents.
 RSSB Publications – UK Rail Safety and Standards Board
 Casper Star-Tribune (June 22, 2005), BP Amoco Timeline. Retrieved June 22, 2005.
 CBS, (June 21, 2005), Deadly Train-Truck Crash In Israel. Retrieved August 13, 2005.
 BBC: Europe's history of rail disasters
 BBC: World's worst rail disasters
 Chicago South Shore and South Bend Railroad accidents. Retrieved January 27, 2005.
 (May 2002), CSX recognizes human error, Trains, p. 22.
 Banerji, Ajai, "Worldwide Railway Accidents, 2000–09", 2011, 
 Edinburgh Evening News (August 17, 2005) Railway worker killed in Channel Tunnel link blaze. Retrieved August 17, 2005.
 Holbrook, Stewart Hall, The Story of American Railroads, Bonanza Books, New York, 1947, .
 IOL Asia (May 19, 2005), Hundreds injured in train accident. Retrieved May 20, 2005.
 Molloy, Tim; Associated Press (January 26, 2005) Suicide try triggers California commuter rail tragedy, police say. Retrieved January 26, 2005.
 National Transportation Safety Board, 2003, Derailment of Amtrak Auto Train PO52-18 on the CSXT Railroad near Crescent City, Florida, April 18, 2002. Railroad Accident Report NTSB/RAR 03–02. Washington, D.C.]
 The Railway Magazine, Network Rail found guilty over Hatfield crash, but managers are acquitted, November 2005, King's Reach Tower, Stamford Street, London, SE1 9LS, pages 13–15.
 Reuters UK (August 16, 2005), [https://web.archive.org/web/20050719111157/http://today.reuters.co.uk/news/newsArticle.aspx?type=topNews One feared dead in rail tunnel fire in south. Retrieved August 17, 2005.
 RIA Novosti (June 13, 2005), Railroad traffic restored. Retrieved June 13, 2005. Details bomb on Russian railroad, June 12.
 RIA Novosti (June 16, 2005), URGENT: Fuel oil in Volga after railroad accident near Rzhev, deputy prosecutor. Retrieved June 16, 2005.
 (May 2005), "Scanner – Rail at fault?", Trains Magazine, p. 21.
 Train wrecks in India
 Trains NewsWire (August 1, 2005), Chinese passenger train derailment kills 5. Retrieved August 3, 2005.
 Trains News Wire (May 4, 2005), Illinois derailment closes UP Overland Route main line. Retrieved May 5, 2005.
 USA Today, February 17, 2006  Train derailment kills 2, page 5A.
 Washington Post, March 16, 2006 Off the Track in Manassas, page B-3.
 Withers, Bob, The President Travels by Train – Politics and Pullmans'', TLC Publishing Inc., Lynchburg, Virginia, 1996, .
 Fox Valley tied to tragic train wrecks, The Herald News Online, March 20, 1999 (ChicagoSuburbanNews.com). Retrieved May 31, 2005.
 United States National Transportation Safety Board Publications

Rail accidents 2000-2009
21st-century railway accidents
2000s in rail transport
Rail accidents